Nagunt Mesa is a  mountain summit located in the Kolob Canyons area of Zion National Park in Washington County, Utah, United States.

Description
Its nearest higher neighbor is Timber Top Mountain,  to the south, with Paria Point and Tucupit Point situated to the north. Walls of Jurassic Navajo sandstone encircle this mesa-like feature, ranging up to 1,400-ft high in places. Precipitation runoff from the mesa drains into Timber Creek, which is part of the Virgin River drainage basin. This feature's nagunt name is the Paiute word for "bighorn sheep".

Climate
Spring and fall are the most favorable seasons to visit Nagunt Mesa. According to the Köppen climate classification system, it is located in a Cold semi-arid climate zone, which is defined by the coldest month having an average mean temperature below 32 °F (0 °C), and at least 50% of the total annual precipitation being received during the spring and summer.

See also

 List of mountains in Utah
 Geology of the Zion and Kolob canyons area
 Colorado Plateau

References

External links

 Zion National Park National Park Service
 Weather forecast: Nagunt Mesa

Mountains of Utah
Zion National Park
Mountains of Washington County, Utah
Rock formations of Utah
Sandstone formations of the United States
Mesas of Utah
Landforms of Washington County, Utah